Estigmene sabulosa is a moth of the  family Erebidae. It was described by Romieux in 1943. It is found in the Democratic Republic of Congo and Zambia.

References

 Natural History Museum Lepidoptera generic names catalog

Spilosomina
Moths described in 1943
Fauna of Zambia
Moths of Africa